Adam Mihálik (born 24 July 2000) is a professional Slovak footballer who currently plays for ViOn Zlaté Moravce as a midfielder.

Club career

FC ViOn Zlaté Moravce
Mihálik made his Fortuna Liga debut for ViOn Zlaté Moravce against Senica on 23 August 2019 in the closing minutes of the 3:1 away victory, when he replaced Denis Duga.

At the start of the 2020–21 season, Mihálik had extended his contract with ViOn by a year.

References

External links
 FC ViOn Zlaté Moravce official club profile 
 
 Futbalnet profile 
 

2000 births
Living people
Sportspeople from Nitra
Slovak footballers
Association football midfielders
FC ViOn Zlaté Moravce players
Slovak Super Liga players